The A&C Bus Corporation, also known as the Montgomery & Westside Independent Bus Owners Association, is an independent bus company headquartered in Jersey City, New Jersey.  All buses operated by A&C are known for their solid red line on the side of the bus and the phrase "use the bus card on this bus" on the front of the bus.

Fleet
Like many other independent bus lines in the state, the fleet is made up of buses leased from New Jersey Transit.

Routes

Former Routes

Bergen Avenue Route
Prior to A&C Bus Corporation's operation of the Bergen Avenue route, the route was operated by Bergen Avenue IBOA.  When Bergen Avenue IBOA was unable to make an insurance payment, it abruptly stopped running its only route on March 12, 2011, the New Jersey Department of Transportation (NJDOT) granted emergency operating authority to A&C Bus Corporation.  A&C Bus Corporation began operating the route on March 16, 2011 with no changes in bus fares, however it reduced operating hours to 6:30AM–10:00PM (running every half-hour).  Since that time, the owners of Bergen Avenue IBOA stated that it intended on selling the rights to operate the route, however the NJDOT stated the company's rights ceased when it abruptly stopped operating with no warning to passengers.

Route 4
Prior to A&C Bus Corporation's assuming operations Route 4 was run by Red & Tan in Hudson County, which discontinued service on November 6, 2011. A&C Bus began operating the route between Greenville and Newport Centre Mall shortly after. It discontinued service on March 2, 2019, citing low ridership. New Jersey Transit route 86 was extended to replace part of the route. New Jersey Transit route 1 was also rerouted to replace some of the former Route 4 service along Communipaw and Pacific Avenues beginning on June 22, 2019.

References

External links
A&C Bus Corporation Website
New Jersey Transit: Private Carriers

Bus transportation in New Jersey
Surface transportation in Greater New York
Transportation in Jersey City, New Jersey
Companies based in Jersey City, New Jersey
Bus companies of the United States
Transportation companies based in New Jersey